Football Club Ballkani, commonly known as Ballkani, is a professional football club based in Suhareka, Kosovo. The club plays in the Football Superleague of Kosovo, which is the top tier of football in the country.

On 25 August 2022, after a victory over Shkupi of North Macedonia, Ballkani made history by qualifying for the group stages of the Europa Conference League; becoming the first ever side from Kosovo to reach the group stages of a UEFA club competition.

History
The club was established in 1947 under the name Rinia by some athletes whose purpose was to participate in various competitions and tournaments that were organized at that time. In 1952, the club was registered and started competing in official championships. In 1965, it changed the name from KF Rinia to KF Ballkani after Suva Reka Chemical and Rubber Industry took the ownership of the club.

The club progressively climbed the Yugoslav league system reaching the Kosovo Provincial League in the season 1973–74. They were relegated, but returned in 1977 and remained in the league until the 1990s. Ballkani was one of the first clubs in Kosovo to leave the league system managed by the Football Association of Yugoslavia, and played instead in the not officially recognized parallel First League of Kosovo until 2000.

In the league organized by the Football Federation of Kosovo, Ballkani played its first match against Liria at Studençan. In the youth levels of Ballkani, many prominent players from Suva Reka started their careers, such as Ali Elshani, Arsim Llapatinca, Avni Bytyçi, Bekim Suka, Dervish Shala, Esheref Berisha, Fillim Guraziu, Gafurr Kabashi, Hajrush Berisha, Hevzi Shalaj, Isuf Asllanaj, Isuf Kolgeci, Lulzim Kolgeci, Musli Bylykbashi, Naser Berisha, Nexhat Elshani, Osman Ramadani, Rexhep Kuçi, Salih Hoxha, Urim Bylykbashi, Visar Berisha and many others who made a valuable contribution to the affirmation of football as well as other human values and some still give their contribution to football pitches as managers and in various sports posts.

Stadium
The club plays its home games at the Suva Reka City Stadium is a multi-purpose stadium in Suva Reka, Kosovo. The stadium has a capacity of 1,500 people all-seater. However, for their inaugural European campaign, home matches were played in Prishtina, at the National Stadium, as Suva Reka City Stadium did not meet UEFA requirements.

Honours

Domestic 

 Superliga e Kosovës
 Winners (1): 2021–22

 Superkupa e Kosovës
 Winners (1): 2023

Players

Current squad

Other players under contract

Personnel

Historical list of coaches 

  Bekim Shotani (Feb 2018–2 Sep 2018)
  Sami Sermaxhaj (6 Sep 2018–14 Apr 2019)
  Gani Sejdiu (16 Apr 2019–Jun 2019)
  Ismet Munishi (8 Jun 2019–December 2020)

Ballkani in Europe

Matches

References

External links
 

KF Ballkani
Association football clubs established in 1947
Football clubs in Yugoslavia
Football clubs in Kosovo